Hollymount is a village on the R331 regional road in County Mayo, Ireland. It lies midway between the towns of Ballinrobe and Claremorris in the plains of south Mayo. It has a post office, a mini-mart, a community centre (Cois Abhainn), a small fuel/petrol station, and various public houses. It also has a Gaelic Athletic Association pitch and health clinic. It has a population of approximately 60 residents.

It was named after the nearby Hollymount Estate, although the village lies within the townland of Kilush.

History 
Roman Catholic records for Hollymount commenced in 1857. Surviving Church of Ireland records commenced in 1845 and civil records commenced in 1864. Gravestone inscriptions go back to the early 18th century.

The Vesey family had a house here from the late seventeenth century: they produced a number of distinguished clergymen.

Transport 
Hollymount railway station opened on 1 November 1892; it closed for passenger traffic on 1 June 1930; and it finally closed altogether on 1 January 1960.

People
Emmet Stagg, politician.
Frank Stagg, hunger striker.
Stephen Coen

See also
 List of towns and villages in Ireland

References 

Towns and villages in County Mayo